"The Miracle on 34th Street" is the Christmas episode of the American anthology television series The 20th Century Fox Hour. Broadcast on December 14, 1955, it was directed by Robert Stevenson, with stars Macdonald Carey, Teresa Wright and Thomas Mitchell as Kris Kringle. One reviewer claimed this version was an improvement over the original movie, stating "shortening the tale has made it brighter and less saccharine."

Cast
Macdonald Carey as Fred Gaily
Teresa Wright as Doris Walker
Thomas Mitchell as Kris Kringle
Sandy Descher as Susan Walker
Hans Conried as Mr. Shellhammer
Ray Collins as Judge Harper
Dick Foran as Thomas Mara
John Abbott as Dr. Sawyer
Don Beddoe as Mr. Macy
Whit Bissell as Dr. Pierce
Sara Berner as Woman Shopper
Herbert Vigran as Postal Clerk
Maudie Prickett as Miss Prossy
Paul Smith as Store Clerk
Herbert Hayes as Mr. Gimbel
Louis Towers as Peter
Earl Robie as Tommy Mara, Jr.

References

External links
 

1955 films
1955 American television episodes
Television anthology episodes
1955 drama films
1950s fantasy films
American children's fantasy films
American children's films
American Christmas films
American drama films
Remakes of American films
Films set in department stores
Films set in New York City
Miracle on 34th Street
Santa Claus in film
Santa Claus in television
Christmas television films
1950s English-language films
1950s American films